The Nugnugaluktuk River is a stream,  long, on the Seward Peninsula in the U.S. state of Alaska. The bay is on Kotzebue Sound of the Chukchi Sea. The entire course of the river lies within the Bering Land Bridge National Preserve.

The river's assigned name comes from the Inuit, as reported in 1903. In 1998, the Inupiat name was recorded as Liglignaqtuugvik.

See also
List of rivers of Alaska

References

Rivers of the Seward Peninsula
Drainage basins of the Chukchi Sea
Rivers of Nome Census Area, Alaska
Rivers of Northwest Arctic Borough, Alaska
Rivers of Alaska
Rivers of Unorganized Borough, Alaska